The Bord Gáis Energy Theatre (originally the Grand Canal Theatre) is a performing arts venue, located in the Docklands of Dublin, Ireland. It is Ireland's largest fixed-seat theatre. It was designed by Daniel Libeskind for the DDDA, built by Joe O'Reilly (Chartered Land), and opened by Harry Crosbie on 18 March 2010. It is owned by Bernie and John Gallagher (of Doyle Hotels), who bought the theatre in 2014 from NAMA, through their company, Crownway.

History

The site originally housed various buildings and structures of the Dublin Gasworks Company which were demolished in 1985 and decontaminated by the DDDA in the late 1990s and early 2000s at a cost of over €50m.

Development (2004–2010)

Grand Canal Theatre (148,171 ext. / 117,132 int. square foot, 2,111 seats) is the largest fixed seated theatre in Ireland, and the only Irish theatre with a stage capable of hosting major London West-End shows.

It would rank as the 4th largest London West-End theatre, and exceeds the capacity of all New York Broadway theatres.

The theatre was built by Joe O'Reilly of Chartered Land (Castlethorn), on a 0.8-acre site, at a reported cost of €80 million (incl. land), to the specifications of the Dublin Docklands Development Authority (or "DDDA").

The cost of the theatre was funded by the sale of two sites, on either side of the theatre, that Joe O'Reilly purchased from the DDDA in 2006.  Therefore, as well as the Grand Canal Theatre, O'Reilly built the south office block (2 Grand Canal Square at 150,000 gla sq ft), and north office blocks (4 & 5 Grand Canal Square at 225,000 gla sq ft), as well as a 222-space car-park (underneath the Grand Canal Square plaza).

Polish-American starchitect Daniel Libeskind designed the theatre for the DDDA in 2004 (who were regenerating the area). Studio Liebskind also designed the office blocks on either side of the theatre (2, 4 & 5 Grand Canal Square) to ensure O'Reilly's scheme was integrated. Studio Liebskind collaborated with RHWL architects in London (theatre specialists) and McCauley Daye O'Connell architects in Dublin (executive architects). Construction started on the theatre in January 2007 and finished in late 2009. The main contractor was John Sisk & Sons and Arups were the main engineers.

The DDDA's wider development of the Grand Canal Square (Grand Canal Dock regeneration project), included another office block (1 Grand Canal Square at 125,000 sq ft, completed in 2007), a 5-star Hotel (the Manuel Aires Mateus designed, Marker Hotel, completed in 2012 but to a lower specification) and a Martha Schwartz designed 10,000 sq ft central piazza (on a "red carpet" theme, integrating with the Liebskind theatre, completed in 2008).

Ownership (2010 onwards)

As construction began in January 2007, the DDDA reportedly proposed the Grand Canal Theatre to the State (Department of Arts and Culture) or the Abbey Theatre, or as a new venue for National Concert Hall, but neither were able to meet the cost of fit-out (circa €4m), or handle the scale of the venue.

The theatre was purchased by Dublin Docklands-based businessman Harry Crosbie (co-owner of Point Theatre, now 3Arena, amongst other docklands properties) for €10m in July 2007 from Joe O'Reilly.  Crosbie borrowed the purchase price, plus another €3.8m for the fit-out, from Allied Irish Banks ("AIB").

Crosbie then leased the management contract for the Grand Canal Theatre to Live Nation (who were also co-owners, and managers, of the 3Arena).

Crosbie officially opened the Grand Canal Theatre with a performance of Swan Lake by the Russian State Ballet of Siberia on 18 March 2010.

The Grand Canal Theatre was formally renamed the Bord Gáis Energy Theatre on 7 March 2012 as part of a 6.5-year naming rights deal with Bord Gáis Energy worth a reported €4.5 million (or €700k per year).

The theatre was put into receivership by the NAMA in April 2013.  Crosbie's AIB theatre loans had been transferred to NAMA, however, Crosbie had larger loans with NAMA on various docklands projects (e.g. Point Village).  He unsuccessfully fought the foreclosure by NAMA's receiver, Grant Thornton.

Grant Thornton took control of the theatre for NAMA, however Live Nation continued to manage the venue and support the sales process with CBRE.

The theatre was sold in September 2014 on behalf of Grant Thornton for €28m (twice what Crosbie paid in 2007, and 40% above CBRE's €20m asking), to Bernie and John Gallagher (of Doyle Hotels), one of Ireland's richest hotel couples.  They had not previously owned a theatre or concert venue.

LiveNation remain as venue managers (not clear if this is Harry Crosbie's original lease or a new management agreement with Bernie and John Gallagher).

Operational performance

Filed accounts (including 2014 CBRE sales materials), indicate that the Bord Gáis Energy Theatre:

 sells circa half a million tickets per year;
 hosts circa 330 events per year (including afternoon and evening shows), close to busiest UK theatres of 350 per year;
 70% of events are described as West-End musicals, and 20% are described as West-End theatre;
 makes circa €8m in revenues per year (tickets, food and beverage, venue hire and naming rights)
 makes circa €1.5m in EBITDA, and circa €1m in pre-tax profit (there is some ambiguity over the definition of EBITDA and pre-tax profit).

Events

Productions
As per above, the Bord Gáis Energy theatre imply that circa 90% of the events are West-End musicals and West-End theatre shows.

The following West End shows have been shown in the theatre:
 Wicked (2013 & 2018)
 The Lion King (2013)
 Blood Brothers (2014)
 Dirty Dancing (2014)
 War Horse (2013)
 Miss Saigon (2017)
 Les Misérables (2018–2019)
 Kinky Boots (2019)
 Book of Mormon (2021)

The following other notable performances have been shown in the theatre:

 In March 2010, the theatre hosted a performance of Swan Lake by the Russian State Ballet of Siberia on 18 March 2010.
 Also in March 2010, the theatre hosted a classical Chinese dance performance Shen Yun by Shen Yun Performing Arts on 28 March 2010. 
 In September 2014, TEDxDublin was held in the theatre.
 In March 2016, the theatre hosted 'RTÉ Centenary', a concert for television to mark the one hundredth anniversary of the 1916 Rising.

Performers

Samantha Mumba
The Beach Boys
Robert Plant
Josh Groban
Tony Bennett
Gavin James
Incubus
Leo Sayer
Marti Pellow
Suede
David Gray
Josh Ritter
Maroon 5
Jedward
Tori Amos
Alexandra Burke
Norah Jones
Kraftwerk
Damien Rice
Conor Oberst
The Waterboys
Janet Jackson
Why Don't We

See also
 Dublin Docklands Development Authority
 Daniel Libeskind
 Martha Schwartz
 Grand Canal Docks
 West End theatre
 Broadway theatre
 Bord Gais Energy

References

External links 

 John and Bernie Gallagher, current owners of the theatre
 Chartered Land, developers of the theatre
 Studio Liebskind, Grand Canal Development
 CBRE Bord Gáis Energy Theatre Brochure 2014

Buildings and structures in Dublin (city)
Dublin Docklands
Music venues in Dublin (city)
Indoor arenas in the Republic of Ireland
Theatres in Dublin (city)
2010 establishments in Ireland
Theatres completed in 2010
Daniel Libeskind buildings
21st-century architecture in the Republic of Ireland